Hatch House may refer to the following houses in the United States:

(sorted by state, then city/town)

Hatch House (Greensboro, Alabama), NRHP-listed
L.H. Hatch House, Franklin, Idaho, listed on the NRHP in Franklin County, Idaho
William H. Hatch House, River Forest, Illinois, listed on the NRHP in Cook County, Illinois
Hatch House (Wells, Maine), NRHP-listed
Ruth and Robert Hatch Jr. House, Wellfleet, Massachusetts, NRHP-listed
Horace Hatch House, Winchester, Massachusetts, NRHP-listed
Vermont Hatch Mansion, Cornwall, New York, NRHP-listed
Barbara Rutherford Hatch House, New York, New York, listed on the NRHP in upper Manhattan
Charles and Elizabeth Hatch House, Rogue River, Oregon, listed on the NRHP in Jackson County, Oregon
Abram Hatch House, Heber City, Utah, NRHP-listed
Ira Hatch House, Panguitch, Utah, contributing in NRHP-listed Panguitch Historic District, designed by Richard Kletting
Seneca W. & Bertha Hatch House, Shorewood, Wisconsin, listed on the NRHP in Milwaukee County, Wisconsin
Horace W. Hatch House, Whitefish Bay, Wisconsin, listed on the NRHP in Milwaukee County, Wisconsin

See also 

 Alfred Hatch Place at Arcola, Gallion, Alabama, listed on the National Register of Historic Places (NRHP) in Hale County, Alabama
 Hatch's Camp, Cache National Forest, Utah, NRHP-listed